Bob Bryan and Mike Bryan were the defending champions, and won in the final 6–2, 6–2, against Mahesh Bhupathi and Mark Knowles.

Seeds

Draw

Finals

Top half

Bottom half

External links
Draw

Sony Ericsson Open - Mens Doubles, 2008
2008 Sony Ericsson Open